John Joseph Thobe (born November 19, 1970) is a former American professional baseball pitcher who played for the Montreal Expos of Major League Baseball (MLB) in 1995.

External links
 

1970 births
Living people
American expatriate baseball players in Canada
Baseball players from Kentucky
Columbus Red Stixx players
Harrisburg Senators players
Kinston Indians players
Major League Baseball pitchers
Montreal Expos players
Ottawa Lynx players
Santa Ana Dons baseball players
Sonoma County Crushers players
Sportspeople from Covington, Kentucky
West Palm Beach Expos players
Mat-Su Miners players